Twelve national teams competed in the Olympic Hockey Tournament at the 1984 Summer Olympics in Los Angeles. Sixteen players were officially enrolled in each squad.

Group A

Australia
Manager: Alan Berry

Ric Charlesworth (c)
Jim Irvine
Colin Batch
David Bell
Adrian Berce
Grant Boyce
Craig Davies
Peter Haselhurst
Treva King
Terry Leece
Grant Mitton
Michael Nobbs
Nigel Patmore
Trevor Smith
Neil Snowden
Terry Walsh (GK)

India
Manager: Nandy Singh Graha

Romeo James (GK)
Manohar Topno
Vineet Kumar Sharma
Somaya Maneypanda
Joaquim Carvalho
Rajinder Singh
Charanjit Kumar
Mervyn Fernandis
Hardeep Singh
Mohammed Shahid
Zafar Iqbal (c)
Pangambam Nilakomol Singh (GK)
Iqbaljit Singh Grewal
Ravinder Pal Singh
Marcellus Gomes
Jalal-ud-Din Syed Rizvi

Malaysia
Manager: M Noordin Hassan

Ahmed Fadzil (GK)
Yahya Atan
Foo Keat Seong
Sukhvinderjeet Singh Kulwant
Michael Chew
Sarjit Singh Kyndan
Stephen Van Huizen
Jagjit Singh Chet
Soon Mustafa bin Karim
Kevin Nunis
Ow Soon Kooi
Tam Chew Seng
Shurentheran Murugesan
Poon Fook Loke (c)
Colin Santa Maria
Zulkifli Abbas

Spain
Manager: Luis Antonio Twose

José Agut (GK)
Javier Cabot
Juan Arbós
Andrés Gómez
Juan Carlos Peón
Jaime Arbós (c)
Ricardo Cabot
Juan Malgosa
Carlos Roca
Mariano Bordas
Ignacio Cobos
Jordi Oliva
Miguel de Paz
Ignacio Escudé
Santiago Malgosa
Jose Miguel García (GK)

United States
Manager: Dewey Lee Yoder

Mohammed Barakat
Ken Barrett
Rawle Cox
Trevor Fernandes
Robert Gregg
Iqbal Manzar (c)
Michael Kraus
Randy Lipscher (GK)
David McMichael
Gary Newton
Michael Newton
Brian Spencer
Morgan Stebbins
Robert Stiles (GK)
Andrew Stone
Nigel Traverso

West Germany
Manager: Hugo Budinger

Christian Bassemir (GK)
Tobias Frank (GK)
Horst-Ulrich Hänel
Carsten Fischer
Karl-Joachim Hürter
Ekkhard Schmidt-Opper (c)
Reinhard Krull
Michael Peter (c)
Stefan Blöcher
Andreas Keller
Thomas Reck
Markku Slawyk
Thomas Gunst
Heiner Dopp
Volker Fried
Dirk Brinkmann

Group B

Canada
Manager: Shiaz Virjee
Head coach: Shiv Jagday

Julian Austin
Ken Goodwin (GK)
Pat Caruso
David Bissett (c)
Patrick Burrows
Rob Smith
Neki Sandhu
Ernest Cholakis
Kip Hladky
Paul Chohan
Ross Rutledge
Reg Plummer
Harbhajan Rai
Bruce MacPherson
Trevor Porritt
Aaron Fernandes

Great Britain
Manager: Roger Self
Head coach: David Whitaker

Ian Taylor (GK)
Veryan Pappin (GK)
Stephen Martin
Paul Barber
Robert Cattrall
Jonathan Potter
Richard Dodds
Billy McConnell
Norman Hughes
David Westcott
Richard Leman
Stephen Batchelor
Sean Kerly
James Duthie
Kulbir Bhaura
Mark Precious

Kenya
Manager: Pritam Sandhu

Emmanuel Oduol (GK)
Julius Akumu
Lucas Alubaha
Michael Omondi
Parminder Singh Saini
Manjeet Singh Panesar
Jitender Singh Panesar
Peter Akatsa
Harvinder Singh Kular
Christopher Otambo
Barjinder Daved (c)
Raphael Fernandes
Sunil Chhabra
Sarabjit Singh Sehmi
Eric Otieno
Julius Mutinda

Netherlands
Manager: Johan Bolhuis

Pierre Hermans (GK)
Arno den Hartog
Cees Jan Diepeveen
Eric Pierik
Theo Doyer
Tom van 't Hek
Peter van Asbeck
Ewout van Asbeck
Hans Kruize
Ties Kruize (c)
Ron Steens
Hidde Kruize
Lex Bos
Roderik Bouwman
René Klaassen
Maarten van Grimbergen

New Zealand
Manager: David Coulter
Head coach: B Maunsell

Jeff Archibald
Husmukh Bhikha
Christopher Brown
George Carnoutsos
Peter Daji
Laurie Gallen
Stuart Grimshaw
Trevor Laurence
Grant McLeod
Brent Miskimmin
Peter Miskimmin
Arthur Parkin (c)
Ramesh Patel
Robin Wilson
Maurice Marquet (GK)
Graham Sligo (GK)

Pakistan
Manager: Manzoor Atif
Head coach: Khwaja Zakauddin

Syed Ghulam Moinuddin (GK)
Qasim Zia
Nasir Ali
Abdul Rashid Al-Hasan
Ayaz Mahmood
Naeem Akhtar
Kaleemullah Khan
Manzoor Hussain (c)
Hassan Sardar
Hanif Khan
Khalid Hamid
Shahid Ali Khan (GK)
Tauqeer Dar
Ishtiaq Ahmed
Saleem Sherwani
Mushtaq Ahmad

References

1984